Mario Ćubel (born 20 March 1990 in Slavonski Brod) is a Croatian professional footballer who plays as a winger.

Club career
Ćubel passed through several lower-tier clubs in the Slavonia region such as Amater Slavonski Brod, Budainka, Slavonac CO, Oriolik, Slatina and Marsonia before moving to NK Rudeš in Zagreb in 2011. He was named as the best player of Druga HNL after the 2012/13 season by the Sportske novosti magazine. On 18 July 2014, Ćubel signed a five-year contract with Croatian club NK Zagreb.

In the summer of 2016 he went on trial at NK Istra 1961, but did not pass, moving subsequently to NK Rudeš, attaining promotion to Prva HNL at the end of the 2016/17 season. He had two half-seasons abroad, with German amateur side Croatia Ulm.

In February 2020 he re-registered with hometown club Marsonia.

References

External links
 

1990 births
Living people
Sportspeople from Slavonski Brod
Association football wingers
Croatian footballers
NK Marsonia players
NK Rudeš players
NK Hrvatski Dragovoljac players
NK Zagreb players
Croatian Football League players
First Football League (Croatia) players
Croatian expatriate footballers
Expatriate footballers in Germany
Croatian expatriate sportspeople in Germany